Aipysurus eydouxii, commonly known as the beaded sea snake, the marbled seasnake,  and the spine-tailed seasnake, is a species of venomous snake in the family Elapidae. A. eydouxii is unusual amongst sea snakes in that it feeds almost exclusively on fish eggs. As part of this unusual diet, this species has lost its fangs, and the venom glands are almost entirely atrophied.

Etymology
The specific name, eydouxii, commemorates French naturalist Joseph Fortuné Théodore Eydoux.

Geographic range
A. eydouxii is found in Western Australia, Northern Territory, Queensland, the South China Sea, the Gulf of Thailand, Indonesia, Peninsular Malaysia, Vietnam, and New Guinea.

Description
The head shields are regular and symmetrical. The smooth dorsal scales are arranged in 17 rows at midbody. The ventrals, which are distinct throughout the length of the body, range from 141 to 149; the subcaudals, from 27 to 30.

Habitat

Diet
A. eydouxii predominately eats the eggs of benthic fishes. Relative to other sea snakes, it has several derived characteristics related to its special diet. These include strong throat musculature, consolidation of lip scales, reduction and loss of teeth, greatly reduced body size, and (due to a dinucleotide deletion in the 3FTx gene) much reduced toxicity of the venom.

Only one other species of sea snake, Emydocephalus annulatus, shares the eggs-only diet of A. eydouxii.

Reproduction
A. eydouxii is ovoviviparous.

References

Further reading
Boulenger GA (1896). Catalogue of the Snakes in the British Museum (Natural History). Volume III., Containing the Families Colubridæ (Opisthoglyphæ and Proteroglyphæ) ... London: Trustees of the British Museum (Natural History). (Taylor and Francis, printers). xiv + 727 pp. + Plates I-XXV. (Aipysurus eydouxii, p. 304).
Goin CJ, Goin OB, Zug GR (1978). Introduction to Herpetology: Third Edition. San Francisco: W.H. Freeman and Company. xi + 378 pp. . (Genus Aipysurus, p. 332).
Gray JE (1849). Catalogue of the Specimens of Snakes in the Collection of the British Museum. London: Trustees of the British Museum. (Edward Newman, printer). xv + 125 pp. (Tomogaster eydouxii, new species, p. 59).
Kharin VE (1981). "A review of sea snakes of the genus Aipysurus (Serpentes, Hydrophiidae)". Zoological Zhurnal 60 (2): 257-264.
Li, Min; Fry, B.G.; Kini, R. Manjunatha (2005). "Putting the brakes on snake venom evolution: The Unique Molecular Evolutionary Patterns of Aipysurus eydouxii (Marbled Sea Snake) Phospholipase A2 Toxins". Molecular Biology and Evolution 22 (4): 934-941.
Smith MA (1943). The Fauna of British India, Ceylon and Burma, Including the Whole of the Indo-Chinese Sub-region. Reptilia and Amphibia. Vol. III.—Serpentes. London: Secretary of State for India. (Taylor and Francis, printers). xii + 583 pp. ("Aepyurus eydouxi [sic]", pp. 445–446).

External links
Li M, Fry BG, Kini RM (2005). "Eggs-Only Diet: Its Implications for the Toxin Profile Changes and Ecology of the Marbled Sea Snake (Aipysurus eydouxii )". Journal of Mol. Evo. 60: 81-89.
Voris HK, Voris HH (1983). "Feeding strategies in marine snakes: an analysis of evolutionary, morphological, behavioral and ecological relationships". American Zool. 23: 411-425.
Government of Australia- Aipysurus eydouxii

eydouxii
Reptiles of Western Australia
Reptiles described in 1849
Taxa named by John Edward Gray